La Villita Historic Arts Village is an art community in downtown San Antonio, Texas, United States. There are art galleries, stores selling souvenirs, gifts, custom jewelry, pottery, and imported Mexican folk art, as well as several restaurants in the district. La Villita connects to the San Antonio River Walk and its outdoor venue, the Arneson River Theatre. It is close to the Alamo, the Henry B. Gonzalez Convention Center, Rivercenter Mall, and HemisFair Park. It is within walking distance of most downtown hotels.

Located on the south bank of the San Antonio River, La Villita was one of San Antonio's first neighborhoods. In 1939, as ground broke on the San Antonio River Walk development, city officials led by Mayor Maury Maverick acted to preserve this part of San Antonio's history. It was a Native American settlement and then a collection of primitive brush huts, called jacales, for the Spanish soldiers (and their Indian wives and children) stationed nearby at the Mission San Antonio de Valero (an active mission from about 1718 to 1793, now better known as the Alamo). After a flood in 1819 washed away most of the huts, more substantial adobe houses replaced them.

Late in the 19th century, European immigrants from Germany, France, and Italy moved into the area and soon became active in business and trades: retailers, bankers, educators, and craftsmen. The variety of architectural styles seen in La Villita's buildings reflects the cultural mix, from the one-room homes of the poor to the larger houses of the prosperous.

La Villita deteriorated into a slum in the early part of the 20th century. During the Great Depression, work began on the River Walk, a make-work project funded by the Works Progress Administration which came close to La Villita. The project, led by Mayor Maury Maverick, sponsored a companion effort in 1939 by the National Youth Administration to restore and preserve this colorful part of San Antonio's history. The NYA offered classes in arts and crafts as part of its program.

Today La Villita is an arts community, and is included in the National Register of Historic Places listings in Bexar County, Texas. The galleries and shops found in one city block offer art by local and regional artists featuring oil paintings, sculptures, watercolors, metal art, rock art, textiles, copperwares, pottery, jewelry, stained glass, and regional folk art.

During four nights of the Fiesta San Antonio each April, La Villita is host to a  Night in Old San Antonio with dozens of booths grouped to offer fifteen areas for various kinds of food, such as Sauerkraut Bend, China Town, Irish Flat, and the Mexican Market. The outdoor festival, with its narrow streets decorated with paper flowers and papel picado (cut paper banners), typically attracts 85,000 celebrants, many wearing costumes and unusual hats. The event is a major fundraiser for the San Antonio Conservation Society.

Contributing properties

Twenty-seven houses or buildings are listed as notable in the district. Some of these are also notable individual listings.

References

External links

 Official web site

National Register of Historic Places in San Antonio
Buildings and structures in San Antonio
Tourist attractions in San Antonio
Historic districts on the National Register of Historic Places in Texas